Buffalo Wild Wings (originally Buffalo Wild Wings & Weck, hence the nickname BDubs, or BW3) is an American casual dining restaurant and sports bar franchise in the United States, Canada, India, Mexico, Panama, Philippines, Saudi Arabia, and United Arab Emirates which specializes in Buffalo wings and sauces.

As of November 2020, it had 1,279 locations across all 50 U.S. states and DC. The company is operated out of Atlanta, Georgia, home to its parent company, Inspire Brands, in the Sandy Springs district just north of downtown Atlanta. However, Inspire still maintains a support center in Minneapolis, Minnesota, the location of its previous headquarters.

History

Buffalo Wild Wings & Weck was founded in 1982 by Jim Disbrow and Scott Lowery. Lowery's parents had become Disbrow's guardians as they were his ice skating coaches. After Disbrow had finished judging an amateur figure skating competition at Kent State University, the pair met up to get some Buffalo-style chicken wings to eat. Failing to find any restaurant serving them, they decided to open their own restaurant serving wings. For the first location, they selected a location near Ohio State University, Columbus. Weck was an original part of the name, as beyond the wings and its dozen sauces, the restaurant served beef on weck.

The pair brought on an additional partner, Mark Lutz, within six months after opening. None had any restaurant experience and thus ran all aspects of the business, including its finances, haphazardly. The restaurant expanded into a chain over the next decade as it added six additional locations in Ohio, Indiana, and Steamboat Springs, Colorado. The Colorado location was selected as they skied there.

The company began to franchise in 1992 by working with Francorp, a Chicago-based law firm. The original franchise fee was $15,000 to $20,000 plus a percentage of sales. Its bottled wing sauces were then manufactured by Wilsey, Inc. of Atlanta. The company's headquarters was set up in 1992 in Cincinnati. By 1993, eight more locations were added, primarily in Ohio.

In late 1994, Disbrow hired a part-time chief financial officer, Sally Smith, who was employed at his new father-in-law's business. In order to get her full-time, the company moved its headquarters to the Minneapolis/Saint Paul area where Smith wished to stay. Smith had to deal with issues with lenders and the Internal Revenue Service and a potential bankruptcy as a part of overhauling its finances. Smith was unable to determine the firm's net income/loss prior to 1995. During 1995, the company did $12 million in revenue with a loss of $1.6 million.

Expecting more growth in 1995, BW3 designed a new prototype free-standing outlet with clear separation between the bar and dining areas and seating 190 in a 5,000- to 7,500-square-foot space. This was a shift in strategy from a college sports-bar to casual dining. The company looked closer at new franchisees' qualifications. Existing franchisees were encouraged to add more locations while more corporate locations were planned. At that time, there were 48 locations with 12 corporate owned.

Smith was promoted to president and CEO in August 1996, while Disbrow became chairman of the board. At the end of the year, 35 new locations were opened. An initial public stock offering was considered in 1998, but discarded given unfavorable market conditions. After using the name variations BW3 and Buffalo Wild Wings in different markets in its first national ad campaign, the decision was made that year to standardize the name throughout the system with the latter. The company moved to increase home sales of their sauces by upgrading the packaging.

The 100th location opened in October 1999 in Apple Valley, Minnesota, a short drive from its corporate headquarters. At the time, there were 23 company owned restaurants. Three venture capital firms and other purchased a majority stake, $8.5 million in shares, available in a December 1999 private placement. The funding was planned to fund expansion with expectation to have 260 sites by late 2003. The company tested several new sauces in 2000 but only added two to the menu with its first dessert. In 2000, the chain, now calling its locations Buffalo Wild Wings Grill & Bar, was in 19 states and 140 locations (at year end) with one finally in the city of its signature menu item, Buffalo, New York.

System-wide revenue was $150 million in 2001 with same-stores averaged growth of 8 percent per year. The company began pushing takeout sales. In late 2001, the company signed on Frito-Lay to its plans for branded potato chips to the retail market.

Disbrow died in October 2002, while Smith continued as company executive with Lowery as vice president of franchise construction. There were 211 locations in 27 states by the end of third quarter of 2003.

In 2010, the company announced an expansion into Canada. In 2015, Buffalo Wild Wings expanded in the United Arab Emirates when it opened a restaurant in Dubai.

In March 2013, the company took a minority stake in PizzaRev upscale pizza restaurant. In August 2014, BW3 had purchased a majority stake in Rusty Taco chain and changed its name to R Taco the next year.

In November 2017, Roark Capital Group and The Wendy's Company, co-owners of Arby's Restaurant Group, announced its plan to purchase the chain for about $2.4 billion plus debt. This deal was completed on February 5, 2018 with Arby's Restaurant Group being renamed Inspire Brands and set up as the holding parent company to Arby's, Buffalo Wild Wings, and R Taco. Inspire Brands intends for each restaurant to keep their individual brands, name, logos, and operating autonomously. On September 5, 2018, Inspire Brands subsidiary R Taco announced it was changing its name back to Rusty Taco. In 2019, Buffalo Wild Wings announced a multiyear deal with MGM Resorts International and its sports betting venture Roar Digital. In 2020, Buffalo Wild Wings announced a national partnership the League of Legends Championship Series (LCS). During the 2022 NCAA Division I men's basketball tournament, Buffalo Wild Wings signed a sponsorship deal with Doug Edert, a breakout star of the Saint Peter's team that went on to become the first 15-seed ever to make a regional tournament final.

Concept
The chain is best known for Buffalo-style chicken wings along with over a dozen sauces, as well as a complement of other items such as chicken tenders and legs. The chain's menu also features appetizers, burgers, tacos, salads, and desserts, along with beer, wine, and other beverages. They are known for their famous "Blazin Wing Challenge." They challenge customers to eat 12 of their hottest wings under six minutes. The winners receive a free T-shirt. The restaurants feature an open layout with a bar area and patio seating flanked by over 50 televisions and media screens. Starting in 2016, the new restaurants being built follow a new type of layout that gives the guests the feeling as if they were actually in a sports stadium. Server uniforms consisted of gray shorts and jerseys with the number 82, signifying the year that the chain was established in 1982. In December 2018, the brand unveiled a new restaurant design featuring a more prominent bar area, flexible seating areas, VIP spaces and large arena-like video screens with anti-glare technology. In 2019, a new uniform was introduced that only includes the company's logo.

Gallery

See also
 List of chicken restaurants

Footnotes

References

External links

 
 SEC filings

1982 establishments in Ohio
2003 initial public offerings
2018 mergers and acquisitions
American companies established in 1982
Chicken chains of the United States
Companies based in Minneapolis
Companies formerly listed on the Nasdaq
History of Kent, Ohio
Poultry restaurants
Restaurants established in 1982
Inspire Brands